Arsentyevka is a rural locality (a selo) in Mikhaylovsky Selsoviet of Mikhaylovsky District, Amur Oblast, Russia. The population was 186 as of 2018. There are 3 streets.

Geography 
Arsentyevka is located on the right left bank of the Zavitaya River, 57 km north of Poyarkovo (the district's administrative centre) by road. Petropavlovka is the nearest rural locality.

References 

Rural localities in Mikhaylovsky District, Amur Oblast